Wilhelm (William) Christian Raugust (March 13, 1895 – December 17, 1970) was an American politician in the state of Washington. He served in the Washington House of Representatives from 1943 to 1949 and in the Senate from 1949 to 1967.

References

1970 deaths
1895 births
Republican Party Washington (state) state senators
Republican Party members of the Washington House of Representatives
20th-century American politicians